This is a list of Dutch football transfers for the 2018–19 winter transfer window by club. Only transfers of clubs in the Eredivisie are included.

Eredivisie

Note: Flags indicate national team as has been defined under FIFA eligibility rules. Players may hold more than one non-FIFA nationality.

ADO Den Haag

In:

Out:

Ajax

In:

Out:

AZ Alkmaar

In:

Out:

De Graafschap

In:

Out:

Emmen

In:

Out:

Excelsior

In:

Out:

Feyenoord

In:

Out:

Fortuna Sittard

In:

Out:

Groningen

In:

Out:

Heerenveen

In:

Out:

Heracles Almelo

In:

Out:

NAC Breda

In:

Out:

PEC Zwolle

In:

Out:

PSV Eindhoven

In:

Out:

Utrecht

In:

Out:

Vitesse

In:

Out:

VVV-Venlo

In:

Out:

Willem II

In:

Out:

References

Dutch
tran
2018-19